Patrik Kittel (born 10 June 1976 in Österåker, Sweden) is a Swedish horse rider. He was born in Stockholm. He competed at the 2008 Summer Olympics in Beijing, where he placed fourth in team dressage.  At the 2012 Summer Olympics he competed in the team dressage events and qualified for the  Grand Prix Special and Grand Prix Freestyle, finishing 14th.

Controversy
The practice of Rollkur or hyperflexion of the horse's neck has been banned by the world governing body, the International Federation for Equestrian Sports (FEI), following the release of video of Swedish dressage rider Patrik Kittel using rollkur during warm up at a competition in Denmark, where the horse's tongue appeared to turn blue as a result of the manoeuvre.

Personal life
He is married to Australian dressage rider Lyndal Oatley.

References

1976 births
Living people
Sportspeople from Stockholm
Swedish dressage riders
Equestrians at the 2008 Summer Olympics
Equestrians at the 2012 Summer Olympics
Equestrians at the 2016 Summer Olympics
Olympic equestrians of Sweden
Swedish male equestrians